Magnetic scalar potential, ψ, is a quantity in classical electromagnetism analogous to electric potential.  It is used to specify the magnetic H-field in cases when there are no free currents, in a manner analogous to using the electric potential to determine the electric field in electrostatics. One important use of ψ is to determine the magnetic field due to permanent magnets when their magnetization is known. The potential is valid in any region with zero current density, thus if currents are confined to wires or surfaces, piecemeal solutions can be stitched together to provide a description of the magnetic field at all points in space.

Magnetic scalar potential 

The scalar potential is a useful quantity in describing the magnetic field, especially for permanent magnets.

Where there is no free current,

so if this holds in simply connected domain we can define a magnetic scalar potential, ψ, as

Using the definition of H:

it follows that

Here,  acts as the source for magnetic field, much like  acts as the source for electric field. So analogously to bound electric charge, the quantity

is called the bound magnetic charge density. Magnetic charges  never occur isolated as magnetic monopoles, but only within dipoles and in magnets with a total magnetic charge sum of zero. The energy of a localized magnetic charge qm in a magnetic scalar potential is
,
and of a magnetic charge density distribution ρm in space
,
where µ0 is the vacuum permeability. This is analog to the energy  of an electric charge q in an electric potential .

If there is free current, one may subtract the contributions of free current per Biot–Savart law from total magnetic field and solve the remainder with the scalar potential method.

See also 
 Magnetic vector potential

Notes

References 
 

 

Potentials
Magnetism